Let It Fly may refer to:

 Let It Fly (The Choir album)
 Let It Fly (Diesel album)
 Let It Fly (Jonny Diaz album)
 "Let It Fly" (song), a 2011 song by Maino
 "Let It Fly", a song by Lil Wayne from Tha Carter V